Azizabad Rural District is a rural district (dehestan) in the Central District of Narmashir County, Kerman Province, Iran. At the 2006 census, its population was 18,061, in 4,057 families. The rural district has 26 villages.

References 

Rural Districts of Kerman Province
Narmashir County